Ananás is a municipality located in the Brazilian state of Tocantins. Its population was 9,492 (2020) and its area is 1,577 km².

The municipality contains 52% of the  Lago de Santa Isabel Environmental Protection Area, created in 2002.

References

Municipalities in Tocantins